Illauneeragh (Gaeilge:An tOileán Iarthach Thiar) is an island in County Galway, Ireland which is connected to Illaunmore at low water.

See also
 Illauneeragh

References

Islands of County Galway

Uninhabited islands of Ireland